The team jumping at the 2008 Summer Olympics took place from August 15 to 18, at the Hong Kong Sports Institute.

The second and third rounds of show-jumping from the individual jumping event were used to determine scores for the team round. The best three scores from teams having more than three competing pairs were used to determine the team score.

Medalists

Results 
The first round of the competition were held on August 17, 2008. The eight highest ranked teams in the first round progressed to the second round, which was held on August 18, 2008.

Illegal substance use 
After Tony André Hansen's horse Camiro tested positive for use of capsaicin, Norway has been stripped of their bronze medals.

References

External links 
 Competition format

Olympics
Equestrian at the 2008 Summer Olympics